Pollington is a village and civil parish in the East Riding of Yorkshire, England. It lies on the north bank of the Aire and Calder Navigation.

According to the 2011 UK census, Pollington parish had a population of 966, an increase on the 2001 UK census figure of 939.

Amenities 
Pollington has one pub, The King's Head. The second pub, The George and Dragon closed permanently.

The village has one primary school, Pollington-Balne Church of England Primary School.

There is a guest house, Parkside Guest House, next to the recreation area and Village Hall.

History

In 1940 the Royal Air Force built an airfield called RAF Snaith north-west of Pollington. From it flew primarily these bombing units: 150 Squadron with Wellingtons from 1941 to 1942 and 51 Squadron with Halifaxes from 1942 to 1945. After 1946 it fell into disuse.

Pollington parish was part of the Goole Rural District in the West Riding of Yorkshire from 1894 to 1974, then in Boothferry district of Humberside until 1996.

The parish church is dedicated to St John the Baptist and is a designated Grade II listed building.

Events 
The first stage of the Tour de Yorkshire 2019 passed through Pollington on the first day of the event.

References

Villages in the East Riding of Yorkshire
Civil parishes in the East Riding of Yorkshire